Phulbani (Sl. No.: 84) is a Vidhan Sabha constituency of Kandhamal district, Odisha, India.

This constituency includes Phulbani,  Phulbani block, Chakapada block, Khajuripada block and Phiringia block.

Elected Members

Fifteen elections held during 1951 to 2014. Elected members from the Phulbani constituency are:
2014: (84): Duguni Kanhar (BJD)
2009: (84): Debendra Kanhar (BJD)
2004: (104): Padmanava Behera (BJD)
2000: (104): Bishnupriya Behera (BJD)
1995: (104): Dasarathi Behera (Independent)
1990: (104): Padmanabha Behera (Janata Dal)
1985: (104): Abhimanyu Behera (Congress)
1980: (104): Chandrasekhar Behera (Congress)
1977: (104): Prahallad Behera (Janata Party)
1974: (104): Chandrasekhar Behera (Congress)
1971: (98): Jagannath Jani (Orissa Jana Congress)
1967: (98): Barada Prasanna Kanhar(Swatantra)
1961: (31): Himansu Sekhar Padhy (Congress)
1957: (25): Himansu Sekhar Padhy (Ganatantra Parishad) and Aniruddha Deepa (Ganatantra Parishad)
1951: (11): Balakrushna Mallik (Independent) and Sadananda Sahu (Independent)

2019 Election Result

2014 Election Result
In 2014 election, Biju Janata Dal candidate Duguni Kanhar defeated Bharatiya Janata Party candidate Deba Narayan Pradhan by a margin of 25,795 votes.

2009 Election Result
In 2009 election, Biju Janata Dal candidate Debendra Kanhar defeated Bharatiya Janata Party candidate Deba Narayan Pradhan by a margin of 8,729 votes.

Notes

References

Assembly constituencies of Odisha
Kandhamal district